There are two species of lizard named African wall gecko:

 Tarentola ephippiata
 Tarentola hoggarensis